Bbox may refer to:

Minimum bounding box, box with the smallest measure within which all the points lie
B-box, form of vocal percussion primarily involving the art of producing drum beats, rhythm, and musical sounds using one's mouth, lips, tongue, and voice
BBOX1, gene that in humans encodes the enzyme gamma-butyrobetaine dioxygenase